United Nations Security Council Resolution 110, adopted on December 16, 1955, stated that in light of an article in the United Nations Charter provided that if a General Conference of the Members of the United Nations for the purpose of reviewing the Charter had not been held before the tenth annual session of the General Assembly such a conference would be held if so decided by a majority vote of the General Assembly and by any seven members of the Security Council.  Having considered United Nations General Assembly Resolution 992 it was decided that a conference to review the Charter should be held.

The resolution was approved by nine votes in favour. The Soviet Union voted against the text and France abstained.

See also
Article 109 of the UN Charter
List of United Nations Security Council Resolutions 101 to 200 (1953–1965)

References
Text of the Resolution at undocs.org

External links
 

 0110
Charter of the United Nations
December 1955 events